This is a list of women writers who were born in Morocco or whose writings are closely associated with that country.

A
Leila Abouzeid (born 1950), Arabic-language novelist
Mririda n’Ait Attik (1900–1940s), poet in Tashelhit, translated into French

B
Latifa Baka (born 1964), novelist, short story writer
Muriel Barbery (born 1969), Moroccan-born French novelist, educator
Hafsa Bekri (born 1948), poet, short story writer, feminist writer
Siham Benchekroun, since 1999, novelist, poet, short story writer
Rajae Benchemsi (born 1957), poet, essayist, novelist
Esther Bendahan (born 1964), Moroccan-born Spanish non-fiction writer, novelist
Khnata Bennouna (born 1940), novelist, short story writer

C
Nadia Chafik (born 1962), novelist, non-fiction writer, educator
Aïcha Chenna (1941–2022), non-fiction writer

D
Zakya Daoud (born 1937 as Jacqueline Loghlam), French-born Moroccan journalist, magazine editor, non-fiction writer
Farida Diouri (1953–2004), novelist
Yvette Duval (1931–2006), Moroccan-born French historian specializing in ancient North Africa

F
Malika al-Fassi (1919–2007), journalist, playwright, novelist

G
Soumya Naâmane Guessous, since 1990, best selling non-fiction writer, sociologist, educator

K
Maguy Kakon (born 1953), non-fiction writer, women's rights activist
Rita El Khayat (born 1944), psychiatrist, publisher, women's rights activist, non-fiction writer
Khnata bent Bakkar (1668–1754), princess consort, biographer, letter writer

L
Leila Lahlou, author of the novel Do Not Forget God (1987) 
Laila Lalami (born 1968), Moroccan-American novelist, essayist
Wafaa Lamrani (born 1960), poet

M
Saida Menebhi (1952–1977), poet, Marxist activist
Fatema Mernissi (1940–2015), feminist writer, sociologist
Malika Mezzane (born 1960), poet and novelist
Malika Moustadraf (1969–2006), feminist writer

N
Mririda n’Ait Attik (c. 1900–c. 1930s), Tashelhit language poet

O
Malika Oufkir (born 1953), memoirist, author of Stolen Lives: Twenty Years in a Desert Jail
Touria Oulehri (1926–2011), novelist, critic

R
Fouzia Rhissassi (born 1947), educators, women's rights activist, non-fiction writer
Najima Rhozali (born 1960), non-fiction writer, politician

S
Thouria Saqqat (1935–1992), children's writer
Hourya Benis Sinaceur (born 1940), philosopher, non-fiction writer

T
Bahaa Trabelsi (born 1966), novelist, journalist, magazine editor

References

See also
List of women writers
List of Moroccan writers

-
Moroccan
Writers
Writers, women